Myrthe Jeanine Schoenaker (born 11 June 1992) is a Dutch handball player who plays for VfL Oldenburg.

References

1992 births
Living people
Dutch female handball players
People from Olst
Expatriate handball players
Dutch expatriate sportspeople in Denmark
Dutch expatriate sportspeople in Germany
Sportspeople from Overijssel
21st-century Dutch women